Senator Hayes may refer to:

Antonio Hayes (born 1977), Maryland State Senate
James E. Hayes (1865–1898), Massachusetts State Senate
Philip H. Hayes (born 1940), Indiana State Senate
Robert W. Hayes Jr. (born 1952), South Carolina State Senate
William P. Hayes (1866–1940), Massachusetts State Senate

See also
Senator Hay (disambiguation)
Senator Hays (disambiguation)